John Michael Carney (born April 20, 1964) is an American former professional football player who was a placekicker in the National Football League (NFL).  He was signed by the Cincinnati Bengals as an undrafted free agent in 1987. He played college football for the Notre Dame Fighting Irish.

Carney was also a member of the Tampa Bay Buccaneers, San Diego Chargers, New Orleans Saints, Los Angeles Rams, Jacksonville Jaguars, Kansas City Chiefs, and New York Giants. He was a Pro Bowl selection with the Chargers in 1994 and with the Giants in 2008.  When he was released from the Saints' active roster in December 2009, Carney was third on the NFL career scoring list with a career total of 2,044 points. He was the last remaining player from the 1980s still active in professional football.  He has also worked as a kicking consultant for the Saints.

Early years
Carney attended Cardinal Newman High School in West Palm Beach, Florida, and lettered in football. In football, he won All-State honors as a punter.

College years
Carney attended the University of Notre Dame and played football for the Fighting Irish from 1984 to 1986. He was named to Notre Dame's all-time team by Sports Illustrated.

Professional career

Cincinnati Bengals
After going undrafted in the 1987 NFL Draft, Carney was signed by the Cincinnati Bengals as an undrafted free agent. He was released prior to the regular season and spent the year out of football.

Tampa Bay Buccaneers
Carney played five games for the Tampa Bay Buccaneers between 1988 and 1989. He converted two of five field goal attempts and all six extra point attempts.

San Diego Chargers
Carney attended training camp with the San Diego Chargers in 1990, but did not make the final roster.

Los Angeles Rams
Carney played one game for the Los Angeles Rams in 1990, but did not attempt a field goal or extra point.  He was the last remaining active Los Angeles Ram, until the team moved back to Los Angeles from St. Louis in 2016.

San Diego Chargers (second stint) 
Carney was re-signed by the Chargers during the 1990 season, appearing in 12 games for the team and converting 19 of 21 field goal attempts. He played 11 seasons with the Chargers through the 2000 season, earning his first Pro Bowl selection in 1994 after going 34-for-38 (89.5 percent) on field goal attempts as the Chargers made it to the Super Bowl. To this day, he remains the Chargers' all-time leading scorer.

New Orleans Saints
Carney signed with the New Orleans Saints as a free agent prior to the 2001 season.

On December 21, 2003, the Saints were trailing the Jaguars 20-13 with 7 seconds left in regulation. Quarterback Aaron Brooks threw the ball in a hurry to Donte Stallworth. As time expired, the Saints continued to lateral the ball around until wide receiver Jerome Pathon eventually scored a touchdown in what became known as the River City Relay. Carney was sent out to kick the extra point to tie the game up and force overtime. Instead, Carney pushed the ball wide right and the Saints lost 19-20.

Carney kicked a game-winning field goal against the Carolina Panthers following Hurricane Katrina. He then appeared on the cover of Sports Illustrated with quarterback Aaron Brooks on September 19, 2005, as the city celebrated this victory.

On April 5, 2007, Carney asked and was given permission to leave the Saints after their acquisition of kicker Olindo Mare.

Jacksonville Jaguars
Following Week 1 of the 2007 NFL Season, Carney signed with the Jacksonville Jaguars replacing injured placekicker Josh Scobee. Carney appeared in eight games for the Jaguars in Scobee's absence, converting nine of 11 field goal attempts and 20 of 21 extra point attempts. He was released on November 19 upon Scobee's return.

Kansas City Chiefs
On November 26, 2007, the Kansas City Star reported that the Kansas City Chiefs would sign Carney after holding tryouts to replace Dave Rayner – making Carney the fourth placekicker to play for the Chiefs within a one-year period, following Lawrence Tynes, Justin Medlock and Rayner. Carney appeared in five games for the Chiefs, going 3-for-3 on field goal attempts and 7-for-7 on extra point attempts.

New York Giants

On August 30, 2008, Carney signed with the New York Giants to fill in while Tynes recovered from a knee injury sustained in training camp. Although Tynes would eventually recover from his injury Carney continued to hold on to the starting position and Tynes was relegated to kickoff duties. At age 44, Carney was the oldest active NFL player during the 2008 season.

After a near perfect season (35-for-38 on field goal attempts with two blocked), Carney was chosen as the starting kicker for the NFC for the 2009 Pro Bowl. Carney was not re-signed after his contract expired, leaving him a free agent entering the 2009 season.

New Orleans Saints (second stint)
Following the announcement that New Orleans Saints placekicker Garrett Hartley would be suspended the first four games of the 2009 season, Carney returned to New Orleans on August 15 on a one-year contract.
With his start on November 30, he became the sixth player in NFL history to reach 300 career games. Carney was waived on December 22, two weeks after Hartley regained the starting job.

On December 24, 2009, the Saints announced that Carney had been hired as a "kicking consultant", with responsibility for the snap and hold as well as working on kicking with his successor, Hartley. The appointment meant that Carney was ineligible to kick for any team for the rest of the 2009 season.  Carney remained with the Saints in this capacity through the playoffs, and received credit for his role in preparing the comparatively inexperienced Hartley to make a number of critical kicks that helped the Saints win their first Super Bowl.

Carney started the 2010 season without a team. However, after Hartley missed 3 out of 7 field goal attempts during the Saints' first 3 games, including a short kick in overtime that would have won a game against the Atlanta Falcons, the Saints re-signed Carney (while also retaining Hartley) on September 28, 2010. The signing made him the oldest active player in the NFL at the age of 46.  On October 3, 2010, he kicked three field goals in a Saints win against the Carolina Panthers, and became the third oldest player to play in an NFL game (behind only George Blanda and Morten Andersen). On October 12, the Saints released Carney for the third time. Carney would not sign with another NFL team.  He, along with George Blanda, is one of two players to play across 4 different decades.

NFL career statistics

NFL records
Most games with 6 or more field goals in a career: 2 – tied with Gary Anderson, Jeff Wilkins, and Jim Bakken
Most games with 6 or more field goals in a season (1993): 2
Most games with 5 or more field goals in a career: 11
Most games with 4 or more field goals in a career: 29
Most decades played: 4 (1980s, 1990s, 2000s, 2010s) – tied with George Blanda

Personal life
He runs a pre-season kicking training camp in San Diego for professional kickers called "The Launching Pad".

Carney is a devout Catholic.

References

External links
John Carney's Official Website
Jacksonville Jaguars biography

1964 births
Living people
Catholics from Connecticut
Catholics from Florida
American Conference Pro Bowl players
American football placekickers
Cincinnati Bengals players
Jacksonville Jaguars players
Kansas City Chiefs players
Los Angeles Rams players
National Conference Pro Bowl players
New Orleans Saints players
New York Giants players
Notre Dame Fighting Irish football players
Sportspeople from West Palm Beach, Florida
Players of American football from Hartford, Connecticut
Players of American football from Florida
San Diego Chargers players
Tampa Bay Buccaneers players
National Football League replacement players